Ladislav "Laco" Déczi (29 March 1938, Bernolákovo, Czechoslovakia) is a Slovak-American jazz trumpeter and composer, leader of Jazz Celula New York.

References

External links
 
 
 Laco Deczi po roce opět vystoupí v Béčku (Deník)  
 Wegbereiter des Bebop in Tschechien: Laco Deczi und seine Band "Celula" (Czech Radio) 
 Laco Déczi nemal na oslavy sedemdesiatky čas (Korzár) 

1938 births
21st-century trumpeters
living people
Slovak expatriates in the United States
Slovak jazz musicians
Slovak trumpeters